Midland College (MC) is a public community college in Midland, Texas. It was established as an independent junior college in 1972 and held its first classes on campus in 1975. It also has numerous locations in other parts of Midland and in Fort Stockton, the Pecos County seat.

History
Midland College began in September 1969 as the Midland campus of the Permian Junior College system. It was recreated in 1972 with the formation of the Midland College District.

Service area
As defined by the Texas Legislature, the official service area of Midland College is all of Crockett, Midland, Pecos, Reagan, and Terrell counties.

Campus

Main campus
Following the formation of the Midland College District in 1972, bonds in the amount of $5,100,000 were issued for the construction of a  campus. Groundbreaking at the new campus was held October 23, 1973.

Opened in the spring of 1975:
 Pevehouse Administration Building
 Abell-Hanger Science Faculty Building
Opened in the fall of 1975:
 Murray Fasken Learning Resource Center
 Dorothy and Clarence Scharbauer, Jr. Student Center
 Technology Center
 Physical Education Building
Opened in 1978:
 Allison Fine Arts Building
 Al G. Langford Chaparral Center
Opened in the following years:
 Davidson Family Health Sciences Building
 Dolly Neal Chapel
 Dorothy and Todd Aaron Medical Science Building
 F. Marie Hall Academic Building
 Helen L. Greathouse Children's Center
 Jack E. Brown Dining Hall
 Leona G. and John E. Fox Science Building

Also, four residence halls are on the Midland College main campus (see below).

Off-campus facilities
 The Advanced Technology Center, located at 3200 W. Cuthbert in Midland, delivers workforce education programs that support the development of a skilled technical workforce for Midland and the Permian Basin.
 The Aviation Maintenance Technology Facility, located at Midland International Airport, Hangar E, 2405 Windecker, offers students training on actual aircraft as they work towards certification in airframe maintenance and powerplant maintenance.
 The Bill Pace Cogdell Learning Center, located at 201 W. Florida, provides ABE, ESL, and GED courses, and houses the MC Business and Economic Development Center.<ref>http://www.midland.edu/for_the_community/cogdell/index.php  Bill Pace Cogdell Learning Center</ref>
 The Petroleum Professional Development Center, located at 105 W. Illinois, provides quality continuing education for the Permian Basin energy industries.
 The Williams Regional Technical Training Center', located at 1309 West I-10 in Fort Stockton, provides university parallel, occupational/technical certificate and associate degree programs, and courses offered in collaboration with the Fort Stockton Independent School District.

Academics
The college offers 100+ degree and certificate programs, as well as a variety of continuing education programs. It also offers a bachelor's degree in organizational management and provides on-campus access to upper-level degrees offered at seven University Center partners.

Midland College is accredited by the Commission on Colleges of the Southern Association of Colleges and Schools to award certificates and associate and baccalaureate degrees. It is also approved by the Texas Higher Education Coordinating Board.

University Center
The Midland College University Center offers students several options for either beginning or completing their education. Programs and courses are now offered by seven area and online universities: Texas Tech University, Lubbock Christian University, the University of Texas of the Permian Basin, Sul Ross State University, Angelo State University, Howard Payne University, and Western Governors University. Four master's degrees and 11 bachelor's degrees, plus Midland College's Bachelor of Applied Technology in Organizational Management and two teacher certification programs, are now offered on the Midland College campus.

Early College High School
Early College High School (ECHS) at Midland College is located on the main campus in the Allison Fine Arts Building. The school welcomed its first freshman class on August 24, 2009. The goal for ECHS is that by the time "the students receive their high school diploma, they will also have an associate’s degree from Midland College."

Special designations
In 2010, Midland College became the first institution in West Texas and the fourth community college in the nation to be designated an All-Steinway School.

In 2013, Midland College became the first community college to be designated a Conn-Selmer School.

Student life
Clubs, intramural sports, cheerleading, student government, and all other student-related activities operate through the Student Activities Office.

Residence halls

The main campus has four residence halls for students: O'Shaughnessy Hall, Nadine and Tom Craddick Hall, Men's Residence Hall, and Family Housing Facility.

Student publicationsChaparral - The MC student news/feature magazine is published once each year, during the spring semester.Tableau - The MC student literary magazine is published once each year during the fall semester.
The student publications office at Midland College also maintains its own website (see below, in External Links)Athletics
The Midland College Chaparrals have won 20 National Championships in sports since 1975, as well as produced 192 All-Americans. A member of the Western Junior College Athletic Conference, Midland College fields teams in:
 Baseball
 Men's basketball
 Women's basketball
 Men's golf
 Softball
 Volleyball

The college's mascot is a Chaparral.

Notable alumni
Jerome Beasley, American basketball player
Mookie Blaylock, American basketball player, NBA All-Star
Anatoli Boisa, basketball player for the national team of Georgia (country).
Chad Campbell, American professional golfer
Tucker Davidson, American baseball pitcher
Kenneth Ferrie, English professional golfer with multiple wins on European PGA Tour
Andrew Hancock, professional photographer whose credits include cover of Sports Illustrated''
Ricky Grace, American-Australian basketball player, NBL Hall of Famer (Perth Wildcats)
Nathan Jawai, Australian basketball player (Galatasaray)
David LeMaster, American playwright and author, teacher, actor and speaker
Milt Palacio, American basketball player
Spud Webb, American basketball player, 1986 NBA Slam Dunk Contest champion
Jonathon Simmons, NBA player for Orlando Magic
Darrell Williams (born 1989), basketball player for Hapoel Tel Aviv of the Israeli Premier League
Lincoln Minor, American basketball player, 1988 NCAA champion (Kansas)

References

External links

 Official website
 Official athletics website

 
Education in Midland, Texas
Universities and colleges accredited by the Southern Association of Colleges and Schools
Community colleges in Texas
Education in Midland County, Texas
NJCAA athletics
1972 establishments in Texas
Educational institutions established in 1972
Odessa, Texas